2MASS J15104761–2818234, sometimes shortened to 2M1510, is a triple or possibly quadruple brown dwarf system, consisting of the eclipsing binary 2M1510A and the wide companion 2M1510B. 2M1510A was found to be an eclipsing binary in the first light data of the SPECULOOS telescopes. It is only the second eclipsing binary brown dwarf found so far (as of March 2020), the other is 2M0535-05. The system verified theoretical models for how brown dwarfs cool. The system is located 120 light-years away from earth in the constellation Libra.

Signs of youth 
2M1510A has hydrogen-alpha emission lines, which is interpreted as a sign of youth. The system also belongs to the  million-year-old Argus moving group and the brown dwarfs have a low surface gravity, which is an additional indicator for youth.

The brown dwarf system 
2M1510A and 2M1510B are separated by 250 astronomical units, making them a resolved binary in 2MASS data. The components of the inner eclipsing binary are called 2M1510Aa and 2M1510Ab. Despite the small letter used in this configuration these objects are not planets, but brown dwarfs that burn deuterium. 2M1510A is not only an eclipsing binary, but also a double-lined spectroscopic binary. This was discovered by follow-up observations with Keck II. The pair orbits each other every 20.9 days. Additionally the 2M1510A source has an elongated PSF in VLT/SINFONI data. This result was not considered by Triaud et al. 2020 and it could represent a contamination of the eclipsing binary, making a test of the cooling models more challenging.

See also 
 List of nearby stellar associations and moving groups
 W2150AB another wide binary
 DENIS-P J020529.0−115925 another triple brown dwarf system

References 

M-type brown dwarfs
Eclipsing binaries
Libra (constellation)
Triple star systems
J15104761–2818234